César Fernando Simões de Sousa (born 20 May 2000) is a professional footballer who plays as a midfielder. Born in Portugal, he represents the Angola national team.

Playing career
Sousa began his senior career with the reserve B-SAD B in the 2020-21 season. He ended up captaining the side, and earned a call up to the senior B-Sad team. He made his professional debut with B-SAD in a 1–1 Primeira Liga loss to S.C. Braga on 11 April 2021. On 6 August 2021, he signed a professional contract with the club until 2025.

International career
Born in Portugal, Sousa is of Angolan descent. He debuted with the Angola national team in a 2–0
2022 FIFA World Cup qualification loss to Gabon on 11 October 2021.

References

External links
 

2000 births
Footballers from Lisbon
Portuguese sportspeople of Angolan descent
Living people
Angolan footballers
Angola international footballers
Portuguese footballers
Association football midfielders
Belenenses SAD players
Primeira Liga players
Liga Portugal 2 players
Campeonato de Portugal (league) players